Richard Grecni (born March 27, 1938) is a former American football linebacker who played with the Minnesota Vikings. He played college football at Ohio University.

References

1938 births
Living people
American football linebackers
Ohio Bobcats football players
Minnesota Vikings players
Players of American football from Akron, Ohio